Edwin T. Gross (September 19, 1916 – January 14, 1989) was an American gymnast and Olympic medalist.  He competed at the 1932 Summer Olympics in Los Angeles where he received a silver medal in tumbling.

Gross died in Seattle, Washington.

References

External links
 
 

1916 births
1985 deaths
American male artistic gymnasts
Gymnasts at the 1932 Summer Olympics
Olympic silver medalists for the United States in gymnastics
Medalists at the 1932 Summer Olympics
20th-century American people